The Calling: Celebrating Sarah Vaughan is a 2001 studio album by Dianne Reeves, recorded in tribute to Sarah Vaughan and mostly featuring songs closely identified with the great singer. In the liner notes, Reeves wrote, "Making this CD is the fulfillment of a dream born when I first heard Sarah Vaughan as a teenager. The dream continued to grow as I marveled at her magical touch with lyrics, melodies, harmonies and timbre. ... She fearlessly explored unfamiliar areas in the realm of vocal musical expression, reaching, ascending, grasping and possessing. Sarah was never content to luxuriate in her past laurels, but her musical appetite propelled her forward throughout her career. She never deserted her calling." Reeves also mentions that her first Vaughan album was Sarah Vaughan with Michel Legrand and tells of how she met Vaughan at a 1975 tribute concert for Cannonball Adderley. She told a woman she was speaking with that she loved Vaughan, not realizing that the woman was Vaughan herself.

Reeves won her second consecutive Grammy Award for Best Jazz Vocal Album for her performance on this album. As of 2018, she has won three more.

Reception 
All About Jazz reviewer Jim Santella wrote, "With a full string orchestra on every track, Reeves unleashes a program of stirring musical arrangements. Billy Childs, a bright guy with forward-leaning ideas, created most of these unique arrangements. The harmony and rhythm is a far cry from average. Reeves is at home with these arrangements, but you get the impression she's holding back. The drama of two Brazilian pieces brings out her emotional strengths most effectively. Dori Caymmi's 'Obsession' and Milton Nascimento's 'The Call' feature wordless chanting with a powerful hook." The recording went on to win "Best Jazz Vocal Album" at the 44th Annual Grammy Awards. More recently, Ted Gioia selected two performances from this album, "Fascinating Rhythm" and "If You Could See Me Now," as "Recommended Versions" of these songs in his book The Jazz Standards.

Song list 
 "Lullaby of Birdland" (George Shearing, George David Weiss) - 4:44
 "Send in the Clowns (Stephen Sondheim) - 6:03
 "Speak Low" (Ogden Nash, Kurt Weill) - 6:26
 "Obsession" (Tracy Mann, Danilo Caymmi, Gilson Peranzzetta)  - 7:37
 "If You Could See Me Now" (Tadd Dameron, Carl Sigman) - 6:44
 "I Remember Sarah" (Billy Childs, Dianne Reeves) - 4:20
 "Key Largo" (Benny Carter, Karl Suessdorf, Leah Worth) - 4:11
 "I Hadn't Anyone Till You" (Ray Noble) - 5:41
 "Fascinating Rhythm" (George Gershwin, Ira Gershwin) - 5:24
 "Embraceable You" (G. Gershwin, I. Gershwin) - 7:56
 "A Chamada (The Call)" (Milton Nascimento) - 6:17

Japanese bonus track
 "Misty" (Erroll Garner, Johnny Burke)

Personnel 
Dianne Reeves – vocals
Clark Terry - trumpet (track 8)
Steve Wilson - soprano & alto saxophones (tracks 2, 4, 7)
Mulgrew Miller - piano (tracks 1,3, 5-8, 12)
Billy Childs - piano (tracks 2, 4, 9)
Romero Lubambo - acoustic guitar (tracks 3, 4, 7, 11)
Russell Malone - acoustic guitar (track 10)
Reginald Veal - acoustic & electric bass (track 9)
Greg Hutchinson - drums
Munyungo Jackson - percussion (tracks 3, 4, 7. 9, 11)

large orchestra, conducted by Childs and Patrick Gandy

Produced by George Duke

References 

2001 albums
Dianne Reeves albums
Blue Note Records albums
Sarah Vaughan tribute albums
Albums produced by George Duke
Grammy Award for Best Jazz Vocal Album